Heliaeschna is a genus of dragonflies in the family Aeshnidae.

The genus contains the following eleven described species:

Heliaeschna bartelsi 
Heliaeschna crassa 
Heliaeschna cynthiae  - Blade-tipped duskhawker
Heliaeschna filostyla 
Heliaeschna fuliginosa  - Black-banded duskhawker
Heliaeschna idae 
Heliaeschna sembe  - Hybrid duskhawker
Heliaeschna simplicia 
Heliaeschna trinervulata  - Pale duskhawker
Heliaeschna ugandica  - Uganda duskhawker
Heliaeschna uninervula

References

Aeshnidae
Anisoptera genera
Taxa named by Edmond de Sélys Longchamps
Taxonomy articles created by Polbot